The Kassonke (Khassonké) language, Xaasongaxango (Xasonga), or Western Maninka (Malinke), is a Manding language spoken by the Khassonké and Malinke of western Mali and by the Malinke of eastern Senegal. Kassonke is a national language in Mali. Western and Eastern Maninka are 90% mutually intelligible, though distinct from the Mandinka (Malinke) of southern Senegal, which is a national language there.

See also
Bafoulabé
Kayes

References

Koite-Herschel, Ute. 1981. La translation du constituent verbal: le cas du xasonga. Mandenkan 2 (Automne 1981):3–16.
Sullivan, Terrence D.. 2004. "A preliminary report of existing information on the Manding languages of West Africa: summary and suggestions for future research." SIL Electronic Survey Reports 2004-005: 34 p. http://www.sil.org/silesr/abstract.asp?ref=2004-005

Manding languages
Languages of the Gambia
Languages of Mali
Languages of Senegal